The Mayor of Casterbridge is a 1921 British silent drama film directed by Sidney Morgan and starring Fred Groves, Pauline Peters and Warwick Ward. It was an adaptation of the 1886 novel The Mayor of Casterbridge by Thomas Hardy  and was made with Hardy's collaboration.

The film was largely filmed in Sussex, mainly in Steyning and partly at Morgan's Shoreham Beach studio, with other scenes filmed in the Dorset town of Dorchester, the actual setting of Casterbridge.

Partial cast
 Fred Groves - Michael Henchard 
 Pauline Peters - Susan Henchard 
 Warwick Ward - Newson 
 Nell Emerald - Furmity Woman 
 Mavis Clair - Elizabeth Jane

References

External links

1921 films
British historical drama films
1920s historical drama films
Films based on The Mayor of Casterbridge
Films directed by Sidney Morgan
British black-and-white films
British silent feature films
1921 drama films
1920s English-language films
1920s British films
Silent drama films